The Daily Press is a daily newspaper published in Victorville, California. It was owned by Freedom Communications from 1978 to 2014, when it was sold to New Media Investment Group. The 2010 circulation total is 23,000 daily and 30,000 on Sundays. The Daily Press also publishes the Hesperia Star and the Lucerne Valley Leader.

References

External links

Official mobile website – archived 2010-11-13

Daily newspapers published in California
Victorville, California
Mass media in San Bernardino County, California
Gannett publications